Fraser Park FC, is an Australian soccer club with senior teams competing in the Football NSW League Two, Youth competing in the Football NSW Boys League Two and the club also has teams participating in the Football NSW Skills Acquisition Program, which is the official Football NSW development program for players age 9 to 12 years. Their home ground is Fraser Park which is on 100 Marrickville Rd, Marrickville.

History 
The Sydney Portugal Community Club was founded on 6th February 1965, a few years after the formation of the Football Club in 1961. Portuguese migrants created the “Clube Português de Sydney”, as it was originally known, in Paddington, in the heart of Sydney’s Eastern Suburbs. It was there that a small number of Portuguese immigrants began to plan the future of the club, which later became Rosebery. 

The club moved to Fraser Park, which had previously been used by the Railway Institute, in the early 1990s.

Team colours 
The club has a distinct Portuguese background, with its colours similar to that of the Portugal national football team.

Notable former players 

  Clint Bolton
  Kelly Cross
  Ante Juric
  Yahya El Hindi
  Peter Pullicino
  Alex Smith
  Florent Indalecio

Honours 
 NSW NPL Boys Youth 3 Club Champions - 2022
 NSW NPL 3/NSW League Two Champions - 2017
 NSW Division 3/NSW NPL 3/NSW League Two Premiers - 1999
 NSW State League/NSW NPL 4 Champions - 2019; 2020
 NSW Division 4 Premiers - 1998

References

External links 
 Club Website

Fraser Park FC
Association football clubs established in 1961
Soccer clubs in Sydney
1961 establishments in Australia
National Premier Leagues clubs
Marrickville, New South Wales